Cooney (from O'Cooney, Gaelic: "Ó Cuana") is a common Irish surname. In various forms, the name dates back to the 12th century. It is first associated with County Tyrone then in the province of Connaught, in the townland of Ballycooney, Loughrea barony, in County Galway, then to County Clare, County Mayo, and Dublin.

Alternate spellings are O'Conney, Coony, Coonahan, Coonihan, Coonie, Coonan, Coumey (Coomey), Coney and Cooihan.  Alternate spellings of O'Cuana are Cuana, Coona, O Cuanaic, and O'Cuanaich. Some with the name Coonifer, Coonihan and Coumey, the latter mainly from County Cork, have been changed into Cooney''.

Surname 
Adam Cooney, AFL football player 
Andrew Cooney, Irish Republican
Anne, Eileen and Elizabeth (Lily) Cooney, the Cooney Sisters, Irish Republicans and members of Cumann na mBan 
Barbara Cooney, children's book author/illustrator
Barney Cooney (1934–2019) – Australian politician
Caroline B. Cooney, author
Edward Cooney, Irish evangelist
Eugenia Cooney
Gerry Cooney, boxer
Jack Cooney (born 1971), Gaelic footballer and manager
James Cooney (1848–1904), Irish-American lawyer
Sergeant James C. Cooney, Struck gold in southwest New Mexico
James Cooney (Medal of Honor), American Medal of Honor recipient
Joan Ganz Cooney, American television producer
Johnny Cooney, American professional baseball player
JP Cooney (born 1980), Irish rugby union player
Joseph Cooney (born 1991), Irish hurler
Kevin Cooney (baseball) (born 1950), American college baseball coach
Mark Cooney, American football in the NFL
Michael Cooney, British screenwriter
Mike Cooney, American politician, Lieutenant Governor of Montana
Patrick Cooney, Irish politician
Philip Cooney, former Bush administration official with ties to the energy business lobby (American Petroleum Institute)
Ray Cooney, British playwright
Richard T. Cooney, American politician
Terry Cooney, American baseball umpire
Thomas C. Cooney, American sailor, Medal of Honor recipient
Tim Cooney (disambiguation), several people
Walter R. Cooney Jr., astronomer
Wayne Cooney, former association football player who played in the League of Ireland during the 1990s

Given name
Cooney Weiland – inducted into the Hockey Hall of Fame in 1971

References

Surnames of Irish origin
Anglicised Irish-language surnames